Dolichoderus tertiarius is an extinct species of Eocene ant in the genus Dolichoderus. Described by Mayr in 1868, fossils of a worker, queen and male were discovered and described in the Baltic amber.

References

†
Eocene insects
Prehistoric insects of Europe
Fossil taxa described in 1868
Fossil ant taxa